Epelis is a genus of moths in the family Geometridae found in Canada and the United States.

Species
 Epelis truncataria (Walker, 1862) – black-banded orange

References

Geometridae
Taxa named by George Duryea Hulst
Geometridae genera